Howlers in the Dock is a 1960 Italian "musicarello" film directed (and co-written) by Lucio Fulci. It is also known as Howlers of the Dock in some reference books. The film was shown on Italian TV under a longer title, Metti, Celentano e Mina...Urlatori alla sbarra.

Plot
 
The film is a fast-paced musical comedy about a band of teddy boys and rock n' roll chicks, whose crazy, fun-loving habits inspire bitter complaints from their neighbors in the town. A prominent blue jeans company owner feels that the kids' poor reputation adversely affects his product's sales and public image. Prevailing upon the youths to help, he engineers a series of promotional stunts to lighten the public's opinion of these good-hearted rock n rollers and their lovely jeans. An unscrupulous politician makes things difficult for the youngsters, but everything turns out well.

Cast 
 Joe Sentieri as Joe Il Rosso 
 Adriano Celentano as Adriano 
 Mina Mazzini as Mina 
 Elke Sommer as Giulia Giommarelli 
 Chet Baker as Chet
 Mario Carotenuto as Professor Giommarelli 
 Turi Pandolfini as Senator Bucci 
 Giacomo Furia as On. Gubellini
 Marilù Tolo as Marilù 
 Umberto Bindi as "Agonia" 
 Corrado Lojacono as Corrado 
 Gianni Meccia as "Satan" 
 Gorni Kramer as Maestro Bremer
 Enzo Garinei as Carimei
 Sandro Giovannini as Giuseppeni
 Bruno Martino 
 Lino Banfi as Leopoldo Cannavone
 I Brutos as a group of shepherds

References

External links

1960 films
1960 musical comedy films
Italian musical comedy films
Films directed by Lucio Fulci
Films scored by Piero Umiliani
Musicarelli
1960s Italian-language films
1960s Italian films